Miles Buchanan (born 1966) is an Australian actor. He is the brother of Simone and Beth Buchanan.

He was a popular actor as a child and young man, winning a Logie in 1979 for his performance in the TV movie A Good Thing Going. However his career was hurt by social phobia and depression. His mother wrote a book about his experiences, called The Wings of Madness.

Select credits
Secret Valley,
Runaway Island,
Home Sweet Home,
The Young Doctors,
A Country Practice,
The Sullivans,
Sons and Daughters,
Hosted The Mike Walsh Show during the International Year of the Child,
A Good Thing Going (won Logie for Best Juvenile Performer,)
The Girl From Tomorrow,
Newsfront,
Dangerous Game,
Bliss,
Flying Doctors,
The Secret Diary of Adrian Mole,
Brighton Beach Memoirs,
Biloxi Blues,
Broadway Bound,
Torchsong Trilogy,
The Restless years,
The Marriage of Figaro,
Midsummer Night's Dream,
Once In a Lifetime,
Possession
Carson's Law
Skyways
Cop Shop
Young Ramsey

References

External links

Miles Buchanan theatre credits at AusStage

1966 births
Australian male actors
Living people
Logie Award winners